The British Rail Class 76, also known as Class EM1 (Electric Mixed-Traffic 1), is a class of 1.5 kV DC, Bo+Bo electric locomotive designed for use on the now-closed Woodhead Line in Northern England.

Tommy — the prototype
The prototype, LNER No. 6701, was completed at Doncaster Works in 1941 to a design by Sir Nigel Gresley, but electrification of the Woodhead Route, together with construction of 69 similar units, was delayed by the Second World War. It was tested on the few sections of 1500 V DC lines owned by the LNER, but had not worked any great distance by 1947 when it was loaned to Dutch Railways to help with their post-war shortage of locomotives. In September 1945, the LNER assigned it the classification EM1; previously it had been unclassified.

The prototype locomotive, renumbered 6000 in June 1946, remained on Dutch Railways until 1952 when the Woodhead electrification was complete. While in the Netherlands, it gained the name Tommy after the nickname given to British soldiers and ran for the rest of its working life with a name plate, which included an explanation of the origin - "So named by drivers of the Netherlands State Railway to whom this locomotive was loaned 1947-1952". It was renumbered to 26000 following the formation of British Railways.

When new, the locomotive had Westinghouse air brakes and dual air and vacuum brakes were provided for the train. For operations in the Netherlands, the vacuum brake equipment was disconnected. When returned to Britain, the vacuum brake was restored but the air brake for the train was removed.

26000 Tommy was used in everyday service, alongside the other EM1 locomotives equipped with train heating boilers. It was withdrawn in March 1970 and scrapped at Crewe two years later, when passenger services were withdrawn over the Woodhead route and several locomotives became surplus to requirements.

The time in the Netherlands had shown that the design did not ride well at high speed due to the bogie design. The buffers and couplings were mounted on the bogies which were then linked together by a drawbar, a feature intended to remove stress from the superstructure. It was also felt that the cabs were too small with poor visibility.

Production locomotives

Between 1950 and 1953, a further 57 locomotives were built at Gorton locomotive works, Manchester, to a modified design; these were also classified EM1. There were also to have been 24 built at Darlington Works, but these were cancelled. Electrical equipment was supplied by Metropolitan-Vickers, who completed the final assembly of the locomotives at Dukinfield Works. They were later reclassified as Class 76, under the TOPS classification scheme introduced on 28 March 1968.

The locomotives were fitted with twin diamond-shaped pantographs. At certain points on the Woodhead Line, notably in the vicinity of steam locomotive water-columns, the electric overhead lines were as high as 20 feet above the tracks. The pantographs had to stretch to almost their full height to reach the wires at some points, as BR practice utilised both raised in normal Woodhead operation in order to maximise current collection under any weather condition.

Although mainly intended for freight working, the locomotives also regularly worked Woodhead Line passenger services – especially after the sale of the Class 77 locomotives to the Netherlands Railways in 1968. Fourteen locomotives (26020, 26046–26057) were fitted with steam heating apparatus. Thirteen of these gained classical Greek names. The names were removed in 1970, after the discontinuance of passenger services in January of that year.

Brief stay in Essex
The lines between London Liverpool Street and  had already been electrified in September 1949, using the same 1500 V DC system. On 27 October 1950, the first two locomotives to be completed, nos. 26001 and 26002, were sent to Ilford depot in Essex for trials; these were joined in early 1951 by 26003–26010. The trials involved a variety of trains, passenger and freight, including tests of the regenerative braking system on Brentwood bank, which has a gradient of 1:103 (0.97%). In June 1951, the ten locomotives were sent north to Wath, where the overhead lines had recently been energised, for further trials.

Brakes and controls
Rheostatic braking was also fitted several years later as an additional safety precaution; this was effective below . Train brakes were operated by vacuum.
From November 1968, thirty of the locomotives were modified for multiple unit (M.U.) control. This became particularly important from January 1970 with the introduction of "Merry-Go-Round" coal trains from South Yorkshire to Fiddlers Ferry Power Station near Widnes, operated by two Class 76s (and banked by two extra locomotives up the Worsborough incline between Wombwell and Silkstone). Such trains became the mainstay of the Woodhead Line in the 1970s. Locomotives fitted with M.U. control were also given train air brakes; the last nine conversions had their train vacuum brakes removed at the same time. A "Clearcall" intercom system was fitted, allowing communication between the drivers of the leading pair and the banking pair of locomotives via the overhead line. An early version of this system had been tried on six of the locomotives in the late 1950s, but had been abandoned as unsatisfactory following tests concluding 26 May 1960. Beyond the Woodhead Line, the trains to Fiddlers Ferry were diesel-hauled west of Manchester.

Liveries
As delivered, the locomotives were painted black (as in the main photograph). From the late 1950s onwards, Brunswick green was adopted, with small yellow warning panels on the cab ends. From the late 1960s and until withdrawal, the Class 76s started to appear in British Rail monastral blue with yellow cab ends.

Withdrawal
The fortunes of the Class 76s were inextricably tied to the fate of the Woodhead Line. The reduction of the freight traffic on the Woodhead Line, plus the ending of passenger services, resulted in the early withdrawal of several locomotives.

By the late 1970s, the locomotives were amongst the oldest in service and yet one of the most reliable classes, on account of robust design on British Rail, and replacement would ultimately become necessary. However, in July 1981, the closure of the Woodhead Line, between Hadfield in the west and Penistone in the east, resulted in the withdrawal of the entire fleet. The final service was operated in the early hours of 18 July 1981 by 76006 and 76014, hauling freight to Manchester.

Class 76 had served well, having been built to an evidently sound design and cared for well by the maintenance teams of Reddish and Wath. Most were still entirely serviceable when withdrawn.  Apparently the Netherlands Railways were interested in their purchase for their heavy freight trains mainly from the North Sea Europoort inland following a good service record of the protype 6000 (Tommy). But controversy regarding the closure of the Woodhead line, BR's policies and of the government of the day plus BR's intention to avoid embarrassment regarding a sale for further use thus discrediting their claims of expired working life from their traction policies as it happened back with the sale of the class 77 as well the greater age of the class 76s compared with the class 77s back in 1968 didn't result in sale for further service. Accordingly, the remaining locomotives were scrapped, many at the yards of Booths of Rotherham, apart from a single preserved example now in the National Railway Museum, York.

Preservation
One locomotive has been preserved by the National Railway Museum along with at least one cab from another locomotive, 76039, at Museum of Science and Industry (MOSI) in Manchester.

The preserved locomotive, 26020 (later 76020), was specially chosen because it was built with stainless steel handrails and had been exhibited at the Festival of Britain. Later, it was the locomotive that pulled the opening day train through the Woodhead Tunnel. It retains the stainless steel handrails, although they are currently painted over.

A complete cabside from 76039 Hector and a door from 76051 are preserved, in original condition, at Barrow Hill Roundhouse.

Models 
Heljan produce a 00 scale model of E26051 in BR Green with half yellow panels.

Class 76 is being made as a kit and a ready-to-run model in OO gauge by Silver Fox Models.

See also
British Rail Class 77
New South Wales 46 class locomotive

Notes

References

Further reading

External links 

 EM1s: The Locomotives The Woodhead Site
 The LNER Electric Bo-Bo Class EM1 (BR Class 76) Locomotives LNER Encyclopedia
 Electric Locomotive Equipment for the Manchester-Sheffield-Wath Line - British Railways Railways Archive

76
Bo+Bo locomotives
Metropolitan-Vickers locomotives
1500 V DC locomotives
Preserved electric locomotives
Railway locomotives introduced in 1941
Standard gauge locomotives of Great Britain
Freight locomotives